As well as being a low mountain range, the Westerwald is also a natural region in the system of natural regional division of Germany. Within that it is a major unit group with the number "32". According to this system the major unit group of the Westerwald belongs to the basement plate (Grundgebirgsschollenland), which describes the type of mountain-building process by which it was formed. The major unit group extends across the states of Hesse, North Rhine-Westphalia and Rhineland-Palatinate. It is roughly bounded by the valleys of the Lahn (east and south), Rhine and Sieg (via Heller), whereby the hills immediately south of the Heller and Sieg are not considered to be part of it.

Natural region divisions 
Below the major unit group are the major units which, in turn, are divided into sub-units, part-units and base-units.

 320 - Gladenbach Uplands (780 km²)
 320.0 Lahn-Dill Upland
 320.00 Breidenbach Bottom
 320.01 Bottenhorn Plateaux
 320.02 Scheld Forest
 320.03 Zollbuche
 320.04 Hörre
 320.05 Krofdorf-Königsberg Forest
 320.1 Gladenbach Hills
 320.10 Damshäuser Kuppen
 320.11 Elnhausen-Michelbach Bowl
 320.12 Salzböde Valley
 320.13 Niederweidbach Basin
 320.2 Upper Lahn Valley
 321 - Dill Valley (174 km²)
 321.0 Lower Dill Valley
 321.1 Upper Dill Valley (with Dietzhölze valley)
 321.2 Struth
 322 - High Westerwald (346 km²)
 322.0 Westerwald Basalt Plateaux
 322.1 Neunkhausen-Weitefeld Plateau
 323 - Upper Westerwald (669 km²)
 323.0 Westerwald East Slope (Dill Westerwald)
 323.1 Upper Westerwald Kuppenland
 323.2 Dreifeld Weiherland
 323.3 South Upper Westerwald Hills
 323.30 Steinefrenzen Plateau
 324 - Lower Westerwald (1316 km²)
 324.0 Emsbach-Gelbach Heights
 324.00 Horchheim Heights
 324.01 Emsbach Valley
 324.02 Plateaux of Welschneudorf
 324.03 Gelbach valley
 324.04 Eppenrode Plateau (Hochstein Ridge)
 324.1 Montabaur Heights
 324.2 Montabaur Basin
 324.3 Kannenbäcker Plateaux
 324.4 Rhein-Wied Ridge
 324.5 Waldbreitbach Wied Valley
 324.6 Sayn-Wied Plateaux
 324.60 Isenburg Sayn Valley
 324.7 Dierdorf Basin
 324.8 Asbach-Altenkirchen Plateaux
 324.80 Asbach Plateau
 324.81 Altenkirchen Plateau
 324.9 Rhine Westerwald Volcanic Ridge

The Westerwald in a narrower sense is generally considered to be the major unit groups 322 to 324.

References

External links 
 BfN-Landschaftssteckbriefe:
 320 Gladenbacher Bergland
 320.0 Lahn-Dill-Bergland
 320.1-2 Gladenbacher Hügelland und Oberes Lahntal
 321 Dilltal
 322 Hoher Westerwald
 323 Oberwesterwald
 323.0 Dillwesterwald
 323.1-2 Oberwesterwälder Kuppenland und Dreifelder Weiherland
 323.3 Südoberwesterwälder Hügelland (mit Gaudernbacher Platte)
 324 Niederwesterwald
 324.0-1, 324.3-6, 324.9: "Montabaurer Westerwald"
 324.2, 324.7-8: "Niederwesterwald"

Literature 
 Emil Meynen, J. Schmithüsen et al. (eds.): Handbuch der naturräumlichen Gliederung Deutschlands. Selbstverlag der Bundesanstalt für Landeskunde, Remagen, 1953–1962 (Part 1, contains issues 1-5), .
 Emil Meynen, J. Schmithüsen et al. (eds.): Handbuch der naturräumlichen Gliederung Deutschlands. Selbstverlag der Bundesanstalt für Landeskunde, Remagen, 1959–1962 (Part 2, contains issues 6-9), .

Natural regions of the Central Uplands
Regions of Rhineland-Palatinate
Westerwald